Solaris Books is an imprint which focuses on publishing science fiction, fantasy and dark fantasy novels and anthologies. The range includes titles by both established and new authors. The range is owned by Rebellion Developments and distributed to the UK and US booktrade via local divisions of Simon & Schuster.

History

Solaris Books was founded in February 2007 by BL Publishing, to trade alongside their existing licence-based imprint the Black Library, and the then-existing Black Flame imprint. When asked why BLP had started the new imprint, Consulting Editor George Mann stated that "...between... the major corporate publishers... and... the small and independent press... there seems to be little or no room left for the midlist," and that Solaris would provide a mass-market platform for up-and-coming writers, or established writers with smaller readerships.

In September 2009, it was announced that Solaris Books had been bought by Rebellion Developments, who also publish comics and graphic novels under 2000 AD imprint and genre fiction under the Abaddon Books imprint, for an undisclosed sum. The imprint came under the leadership of Abaddon editor Jonathan Oliver, who ran both imprints side by side as Editor-in-Chief, along with editors David Moore and Jenni Hill.

The new team continues to publish books in the Solaris tradition, maintaining existing relationships with authors such as Brian Lumley, Andy Remic and Juliet McKenna and also discovering new voices in the SF and fantasy genres. As of August 2010, Solaris had published seventy-three titles by twenty-nine authors, including anthologies and new editions of out-of-print titles.

Authors

Adam Roberts
Andy Remic
Ben Jeapes
Brian Lumley
Christopher Fowler
Chris Roberson
Ed Greenwood
Emily Gee
Eric Brown
Gail Z. Martin
Gareth L. Powell
George Mann
Ian Whates
James Goss
James Lovegrove
James Maxey
Juliet McKenna
Keith Brooke
Natasha Rhodes
Paul Kearney
Silvia Moreno-Garcia
Simon R. Green
Tim Akers
Weston Ochse

Publications

Arch Wizard (by Ed Greenwood, December 2008)
Bitterwood (by James Maxey, July 2007)
Dante's Girl (by Natasha Rhodes, March 2007)
Dark Lord (by Ed Greenwood, September 2007)
Deadstock (by Jeffrey Thomas, March 2007)
Helix: (by Eric Brown, June 2007)
House of Fear Anthology edited by Jonathan Oliver Infinity Plus (edited by Keith Brooke and Nick Gevers, August 2007)Phoenicia's Worlds (by Ben Jeapes, 2013)Set the Seas on Fire (by Chris Roberson, August 2007)Splinter (by Adam Roberts, September 2007)The Solaris Book of New Fantasy (edited by George Mann, December 2007)The Solaris Book of New Science Fiction (edited by George Mann, February 2007)
 The Solaris Book of New Science Fiction, Volume Three (edited by George Mann, 2009)
 The Solaris Book of New Science Fiction, Volume Two (edited by George Mann, 2008)The Summoner (by Gail Z. Martin, February 2007)The Touch (by Brian Lumley, March 2007)Thief With No Shadow (by Emily Gee, May 2007)

Awards
Alastair Reynolds' story "The Fixation", from The Solaris Book of New Science Fiction: Volume Three, won the 2009 Sidewise Award for Alternate History (Short Form).
Chris Roberson's The Dragon's Nine Sons won the 2008 Sidewise Award for Alternate History (Long Form).
Ellen Datlow's Poe Anthology won the 2010 Black Quill Award for Best Dark Genre Anthology (Readers' Choice), and the 2010 Shirley Jackson Award for an Edited Anthology, and was nominated for the 2010 Bram Stoker Award for Superior Achievement in an Anthology.
Mary Robinette Kowal's story "Evil Robot Monkey", from The Solaris Book of New Science Fiction: Volume Two, was nominated for the 2009 Hugo Award for Best Short Story.
Mary Rosenblum's story "Sacrifice", from Sideways in Crime, won the 2008 Sidewise Award for Alternate History (Short Form). Tobias Buckell's story "The People's Machine", and Kristine Kathryn Rusch's story "G-Men", both from Sideways in Crime, were nominated in the same category.
Paul Cornell's story "One of Our Bastards is Missing", from The Solaris Book of New Science Fiction: Volume Three, was nominated for the 2010 Hugo Award for Best Novelette.
Stephen Baxter's story "Last Contact", from The Solaris Book of New Science Fiction, was a finalist in the 2008 Locus Award for Short Story and a nominee for the 2008 Hugo Award for Short Story.

See also2000 AD, a comics anthology, publishing fiction featuring characters such as Judge Dredd and, through their sister comics magazine Judge Dredd Megazine'', Tank Girl
Abaddon Books, another Rebellion imprint releasing speculative fiction novels in a number of themed lines
Black Flame, another BL Publishing imprint largely focused on licensed franchises

Notes

References

Solaris Books at the Internet Speculative Fiction Database

External links

Rebellion Developments
British companies established in 2007
Book publishing companies of the United Kingdom